Ogmodera is a genus of beetles in the family Cerambycidae, containing the following species:

 Ogmodera albovittata Breuning, 1974
 Ogmodera forticornis Breuning, 1942
 Ogmodera kenyensis Breuning, 1939
 Ogmodera lobata Breuning, 1942
 Ogmodera multialboguttata Breuning, 1946
 Ogmodera nigrociliata Breuning, 1960
 Ogmodera sudanica Breuning, 1973
 Ogmodera sulcata Aurivillius, 1908

References

Apomecynini